Brian Van Holt (born July 6, 1969) is an American actor. He is best known for playing Bo and Vincent Sinclair in House of Wax and Bobby Cobb on the TV series Cougar Town.

Early life
Brian Van Holt was born in Waukegan, Illinois on July 6, 1969, and was raised in Huntington Beach, California. He is of  Scottish and Irish descent (not Dutch as is widely believed), saying in April 2003, "My nickname is 'Dutch' but my family's part of the McGregor clan. No one really knows where 'Van Holt' came from." He graduated from UCLA in 1993, with a major in sociology and a minor in psychology.

Career
Van Holt was cast in several films and television series beginning with A Very Brady Sequel in 1996, followed by appearances in episodes of Beverly Hills, 90210, Spin City, Homicide: Life on the Street, Martial Law, and Sex and the City. He then appeared in the feature films, Black Hawk Down, Windtalkers, Confidence, Basic and S.W.A.T.. 

He has since appeared in Man of the House, House of Wax, and the short-lived CBS series Threshold. Van Holt revisited his surfer roots when he was cast in David Milch's HBO series John from Cincinnati as Butchie Yost, son of surfing legend Mitch Yost. He also played Kyle Hobart in the TV series Sons of Anarchy. He guest-starred in the hit show CSI: Miami.

In 2008, he had a small role as himself (an actor) playing a firefighter in two fifth-season episodes of Entourage. From 2009 to 2015, Van Holt appeared as one of the seven main characters on Cougar Town as Bobby Cobb, the ex-husband of lead character Jules Cobb and father of their son Travis. He appeared in six seasons of Cougar Town, exiting the show at the beginning of the sixth and final season. He also directed the second episode of the fifth season, "Like a Diamond", which aired on January 14, 2014.

Filmography

Film

Television

References

External links
 

1969 births
20th-century American male actors
21st-century American male actors
Actors from Waukegan, Illinois
American male film actors
American male television actors
American people of Irish descent
American people of Scottish descent
Living people
Male actors from California
Male actors from Illinois
People from Greater Los Angeles
University of California, Los Angeles alumni